NSWC may refer to:

 National Security and War Course, at the National Defence University, Pakistan
 Neighbourhood and Worker's Service Centre, a pro-democracy political group in Hong Kong

United states military and intelligence community
 National SIGINT Watch Center, original name of the United States National Security Operations Center
 Naval Surface Warfare Center, part of United States Naval Sea Systems Command operations
 United States Naval Special Warfare Command, the Naval component of United States Special Operations Command

See also
 National Security Whistleblowers Coalition (NSWBC), a non-profit alliance of whistleblowers